Mecodema punctellum is a presumed-extinct species of ground beetle of the family Carabidae, endemic to Stephens Island in New Zealand.

Description

Habitat and biology
Nothing is known about its habitat, but it is assumed that it occurred in wet forests and sought shelter under large logs. It was a predator of snails.

Extinction
Mecodema punctellum was last seen in 1931, and after surveys in 1961, 1971, 1974/5, 1976, 1981, 1990, 1996 on Stephens Island, and 1997 on D'Urville Island failed, it is now considered to be extinct. The cause of its extinction was probably habitat destruction, because after the clearing of forest there were no large logs remaining on Stephens Island.

References and external links

 Fauna of New Zealand Series: Mecodema punctellum
 Britton (1949) description and Image of Mecodema punctellum

†
Extinct beetles
Extinct insects since 1500
†punctellum
Beetles described in 1921